The third season of the American science fiction dystopian television series Westworld (subtitled The New World) premiered on HBO on March 15, 2020, and concluded on May 3, 2020, consisting of eight episodes.

The television series was created by Jonathan Nolan and Lisa Joy, and it is based on the 1973 film of the same name, written and directed by Michael Crichton. The third season stars an ensemble cast led by Evan Rachel Wood, Thandiwe Newton, Jeffrey Wright, Tessa Thompson, newcomer Aaron Paul, and Ed Harris. Vincent Cassel is introduced as the main antagonist.

The third season initially received positive reviews from critics, though reception became mixed during the second half. Reviews praised the performances, visuals and change in tone from the first two seasons, but criticized the story, dialogue and pacing, as well as the perceived lack of thematic depth.

Plot summary
The third season takes place three months after the events of the second season, with Dolores having escaped Westworld along with a few processing cores ("pearls"), including Bernard's. Taking residence in neo-Los Angeles in 2053, Dolores develops a relationship with Caleb and comes to learn how artificial beings and lower-class humans are treated in the real world. Meanwhile, Maeve finds herself in another part of the Delos park, one based on Fascist Italy during World War II. William, who also left Westworld at the end of the second season, is now haunted by visions of his daughter Emily and Dolores.

Cast and characters

Main
 Evan Rachel Wood as Dolores Abernathy
 Thandiwe Newton as Maeve Millay
 Jeffrey Wright as Bernard Lowe
 Tessa Thompson as Dolores Abernathy / Charlotte Hale
 Aaron Paul as Caleb Nichols
 Ed Harris as William
 Luke Hemsworth as Ashley Stubbs
 Simon Quarterman as Lee Sizemore
 Vincent Cassel as Engerraund Serac
 Angela Sarafyan as Clementine Pennyfeather 
 Tao Okamoto as Hanaryo

Recurring
 John Gallagher Jr. as Liam Dempsey Jr.
 Tommy Flanagan as Martin Connells / Dolores Abernathy
 Lena Waithe as Ash
 Scott Mescudi as Francis
 Marshawn Lynch as Giggles
 Pom Klementieff as Martel
 Russell Wong as Brompton
 Payman Maadi as Elliot
 Iddo Goldberg as Sebastian
 Enrico Colantoni as Whitman
 Jonathan Tucker as Major Craddock

Guest

 Rafi Gavron as Roderick
 Phoebe Tonkin as Penny
 Thomas Kretschmann as Gerald
 Wayne Péré as Therapist
 Michael Filipowich as Joe
 Charmin Lee as Joanna
 Rodrigo Santoro as Hector Escaton / Ettore
 Leonardo Nam as Felix Lutz
 Ptolemy Slocum as Sylvester
 D. B. Weiss as Dan
 David Benioff as Dave
 David Danipour as Benny
 Michael Ealy as Jake
 Nadine Lewington as Gerhart
 Jaxon Williams as Nathan
 Katy M. O'Brian as EMT
 Lawrence Adimora as Second EMT
 Derek Smith as Stanton
 Sol Landerman as Clyde
 Katja Herbers as Emily Grace
 Hiroyuki Sanada as Musashi / Sato (Dolores Abernathy)
 Elizabeth Anweis as The Mortician
 Adam Wang as Jiang
 Paul-Mikél Williams as Charlie
 Jefferson Mays as Liam Dempsey Sr.
 Alexandre Bar as young Serac
 Paul Cooper as Jean-Mi / Solomon
 Al Coronel as President Filo
 Bahia Haifi Gold as Dr. Greene
 Jimmi Simpson as young William
 Peter Mullan as James Delos
 Zayd Kiszonak as child William
 Siena Goines as Dr. Natasha Lang
 Louis Ferreira as Dr. Alpert
 Jasmyn Rae as Maeve's Daughter
 Clifton Collins Jr. as Lawrence Gonzalez (Dolores Abernathy)
 Gina Torres as Lauren
 Michael Rose as McClean

Episodes

Production

A third season of the series was announced on May 1, 2018. Production began on April 13, 2019. Parts of filming took place in Downtown Los Angeles and Singapore during June 14, 2019. 

Additional filming took place over a ten-day period in Singapore around July 2019, which was used to present a version of Los Angeles about 40 years out from the time of the production of the show.  Showrunners Jonathan Nolan and Lisa Joy had considered how they would introduce the "real world" outside of the park in the early days of developing Westworld. They wanted to go in the opposite dystopian direction that the 1982 film Blade Runner had gone and instead show a more optimistic view. The two had seen how Spike Jonze had filmed Her in Shanghai as a future Los Angeles, and took inspiration from many of Shanghai's designs. Joy, who had been suggested to shoot in Singapore by her friend and architect Bjarke Ingels, said the city was apt for the show as "It's the ways in which nature entangle with modernity here". The show's main cast, including Wood, Newton, Wright, and Paul had been spotted at several Singapore locations during the shooting period across Pulau Ubin, Chinatown and the Central Business District (CBD) within the city, and included specific landmarks such as the National Gallery Singapore, Esplanade Park, School of the Arts, the Helix Bridge, Marina One, the Parkroyal Hotel, LASALLE College of the Arts, and the Oasia Hotel Downtown. Additional filming took place at the City of Arts and Sciences in Valencia, Spain. 

Filming also took place in Los Angeles, using computer-generated imagery to fill in actual buildings from Shanghai, futuristic buildings inspired by those from Shanghai, as well as those from Ingels' unused portfolio. The production team collaborated with Jon Favreau who led the advances in the special effects filming for The Mandalorian on how they combined full exterior filming with on-set filming and digital post-production to create virtually expandable sets at these sites as needed. When filming interior shots that took place in Los Angeles, the production team had a mandate to try to show as much of the city skyline as possible through windows or other features. Much of the city's brutalist architecture was also features given how frequently these buildings were repurposed from their original function.

While they had been able to film in the Frank Lloyd Wright-designed Millard House in Pasadena, as Arnold's home in the second season as it was available on the market, by the time they started filming season three, the home had been sold and they could not arrange filming rights. Instead, they opted to rebuild the home on set for this season. With Ingels' help to negotiation with Ricardo Bofill's son, they were also able to obtain rights to film one day at Bofill's La Fábrica near Barcelona, which stood in for Serac's laboratories and home, though they had to later build additional sets with the building's design principles for later filming. According to production designer Howard Cummings, they wanted to focus on concrete buildings that could look like the result of 3D printing.

The structure of the third season is more linear than past seasons, which Variety Adam B. Vary said was a "sleek, fleet, Heat-style-crime-thriller-with-robots" rather than a "time-twisting structure" from the second season. Nolan and Joy stated that season 3 would have a much more comprehensible story line, with Nolan stating "This season is a little less of a guessing game and more of an experience with the hosts finally getting to meet their makers." However, they also said that they were able to take a more direct narrative approach as, according to Nolan, "We're very lucky in that we're at a place with HBO where they let us make the show we want to make" without having to "dumb the show down".

Music

Ramin Djawadi returned as the series composer. An orchestral cover of Guns N' Roses' "Sweet Child o' Mine" was featured in the main trailer and released as a single on February 21, 2020. An orchestral version of Moses Sumney's "Doomed" was featured at the end of the episode "The Absence of Field", alongside the original song. An orchestral version of The Weeknd's "Wicked Games", featured in the episode "The Mother of Exiles", was released as a single on April 5, 2020. The soundtrack album for season 3 was released on May 4, 2020. An orchestral version of "Brain Damage" from Pink Floyd's The Dark Side of the Moon was featured at the end of "Crisis Theory", alongside the original song; the song was also used in the first trailer for the season.

Marketing
A first teaser trailer was presented at the 2019 San Diego Comic Con on July 20, 2019. A teaser for season 3 was released on November 9, 2019, presented as a video advertisement for the fictional company Incite, Inc. At the Consumer Electronics Show on January 9, 2020, HBO held a special event hosted by Incite, with "hosts" attending the invited guests' needs.

The premiere date for the third season was announced on January 12, 2020, alongside a teaser trailer for the season. The full season's trailer was released on February 20, 2020. Additional teaser videos were found through an alternate reality game via the Incite website that was updated on February 22, 2020.

Reception

Critical response

The review aggregator Rotten Tomatoes reports an approval rating of 73% for the season based on 222 reviews, with an average rating of 7.05/10; the average episode score is 76%. The website's critical consensus reads: "Westworld succeeds in rebooting itself by broadening its scope beyond its titular amusement park while tightening its storytelling clarity – although some may feel that the soul has been stripped from this machine in the process." Metacritic, which uses a weighted average, assigned a score of 64 out of 100 based on 22 critics, indicating "generally favorable reviews".

Reviews became increasingly mixed as the season progressed, with the episodes "Genre", "Passed Pawn" and "Crisis Theory" receiving the lowest Rotten Tomatoes approval ratings for the series to date. Reviewers criticized the season for its dialogue, thin characterization, and depiction of the real world, which was said to lack the vastness and depth of the park. 

CNNs Brian Lowry wrote that "the show has become increasingly incomprehensible, at least for anyone not willing to put in the work trying to remember all the assorted connections, further complicated by the fact that dying in Westworld is often not a permanent state of affairs, amid the questions about who's truly human and who actually isn't." Writing for Entertainment Weekly, Kristen Baldwin gave the series a "B−" and said: "After spending three seasons struggling through maddeningly complicated time-loops, it's time the writers let Dolores, Maeve, and Bernard control-alt-delete themselves" while Darren Franich wrote that series had "lost its way" and gave the season a "C". Reviewing the season finale for IndieWire, Ben Travers said: "Season 3 made a point of stripping away the rest of Westworlds building blocks: The park? Left behind. The maze? Gone. But the moral questions meant to keep you invested in the characters largely disappear, too. Season 3 doesn't bother developing its characters because it refuses to let them question the nature of their own reality."

Ratings

Accolades
For the 72nd Primetime Emmy Awards, Thandiwe Newton was nominated for Outstanding Supporting Actress in a Drama Series and Jeffrey Wright was nominated for Outstanding Supporting Actor in a Drama Series. The series received nine additional nominations in creative and technical categories.

Notes

References

External links

 
 

2020 American television seasons
Westworld
Television shows filmed in Singapore
Television shows filmed in Spain